Green Point, Tasmania, is a far northern suburb of Hobart, located south of Bridgewater.

External links
 Google Maps, a map of the area.

Localities of Brighton Council (Tasmania)